Maree Anne Holland; born 25 July 1963 in Parramatta) is a retired Australian sprinter who specialised in the 400 metres. She represented her country at the 1988 Summer Olympics finishing eighth in the final. She also competed at the 1989 World Indoor Championships and 1990 Commonwealth Games finishing fourth on both occasions.

International competitions

1Representing Oceania

Personal bests
Outdoor
200 metres – 22.83 (+1.7 m/s, Chiba 1988)
400 metres – 50.24 (Seoul 1988)
Indoor
400 metres – 52.17 (Budapest 1989) AR

References

All-Athletics profile

1963 births
Living people
People from Parramatta
Sportswomen from New South Wales
Australian female sprinters
Olympic athletes of Australia
Athletes (track and field) at the 1988 Summer Olympics
Commonwealth Games silver medallists for Australia
Commonwealth Games bronze medallists for Australia
Commonwealth Games medallists in athletics
Athletes (track and field) at the 1986 Commonwealth Games
Athletes (track and field) at the 1990 Commonwealth Games
Athletes from Sydney
Olympic female sprinters
20th-century Australian women
21st-century Australian women
Medallists at the 1990 Commonwealth Games